Solar purpura (also known as "Actinic purpura," and "Senile purpura") is a skin condition characterized by large, sharply outlined, 1- to 5-cm, dark purplish-red ecchymoses appearing on the dorsa of the forearms and less often the hands.

The condition is most common in elderly people of European descent. It is caused by sun-induced damage to the connective tissue of the skin.

No treatment is necessary. The lesions typically fade over a period of up to three weeks.

See also 
 List of cutaneous conditions

References

External links 

Vascular-related cutaneous conditions